Beverly of Graustark is a 1926 American silent romantic comedy film directed by Sidney Franklin and starring Marion Davies, Antonio Moreno, and Creighton Hale. The film's screenplay was written by Agnes Christine Johnston based on the novel by George Barr McCutcheon, and set in the fictional land of Graustark. The film features a final sequence in Technicolor. It was the first film by Sidney Franklin for MGM.

The story was filmed before in 1914 by the Biograph Company.

Copies of the film are held at Turner Broadcasting and the Library of Congress. Click on the Library of Congress external link below to watch the 1914 version of the film.

Premise
Beverly Calhoun (Davies) impersonates the Prince of Graustark to claim his birthright while he recovers from a skiing injury. In the meantime, she falls for her bodyguard Dantan (Moreno).

Cast
 Marion Davies as Beverly Calhoun
 Antonio Moreno as Dantan
 Creighton Hale as Prince Oscar
 Roy D'Arcy as General Marlanax
 Albert Gran as Duke Travina
 Paulette Duval as Carlotta
 Max Barwyn as Saranoff
 Charles Clary as Mr. Calhoun

Production
In her 22nd film, Marion Davies starred in yet another dual role as the American Beverly Calhoun who masquerades as her cousin Oscar, who happens to be the Prince of Graustark, a small European monarchy. This was the second time that Davies masqueraded as a male (see Little Old New York), and critics and audiences applauded the effort. The film is often cited as Davies' most profitable film because of low production costs and big box office. The only problem in filming was Davies' 10-day bout with the flu. This was her first teaming with Antonio Moreno, who played the royal bodyguard. The film boasted a 2-strip Technicolor finale (which survives). Davies' severe haircut, dubbed the "Beverly Bob," caused a fashion craze.

Restoration 
The Library of Congress restored the 1926 film in 2019, scanning an original-release 35mm nitrate print in the Marion Davies Collection that included the 2-color Technicolor sequence in the 2nd half of the film's last reel. This 4K restoration was screened in October 2019 at the Pordenone Silent Film Festival. Undercrank Productions released the restoration on Blu-ray and DVD in April 2022, featuring a new musical score by Ben Model.

See also
 List of early color feature films

References

External links

 Library of Congress viewable copy of the 1914 film (57 min. 4 sec.)
 
 
 
 
 Still of Hale and Davies (University of Washington, Sayre collection)

1926 romantic comedy films
1920s color films
1926 films
American LGBT-related films
American silent feature films
Films directed by Sidney Franklin
Metro-Goldwyn-Mayer films
Silent films in color
American romantic comedy films
Films set in Europe
1920s LGBT-related films
1920s American films
Silent romantic comedy films
Silent American comedy films